The following is a list of the administrators of the Comédie-Française, from 1799, date of the merger between the Théâtre de la Nation and the Théâtre de la République.

See also
 Sociétaires of the Comédie-Française

Notes

Sources
  Site of the Comédie-Française